Michael John Smith (born May 19, 1965) is a retired American basketball player and television commentator. During his college years, he played for Brigham Young University, where he was a consensus second team All-American. As a professional player, he spent two seasons in the NBA with the Boston Celtics and part of one season with the Los Angeles Clippers. He also spent several years playing in Liga ACB and Lega Basket. After retiring from professional basketball, he worked for several years as the television color analyst for the Los Angeles Clippers.

College career 
After attending Los Altos High School in Hacienda Heights, California, Smith was a standout basketball player at Brigham Young University. He excelled in both football and volleyball before concentrating on basketball exclusively. Smith served two years (1984–86) as a missionary for the Church of Jesus Christ of Latter-Day Saints in Argentina before returning to BYU to finish his collegiate basketball career.  He won the WAC Player of the Year in 1988 leading the team with 679 points and 248 rebounds.  He finished his collegiate career as BYU's all-time leader in rebounds (922) and second to Danny Ainge in career points (2319).

Professional career

Boston Celtics (1989–1991) 
Smith was selected 13th overall in the first round of the 1989 NBA draft by the Boston Celtics. He was one of the oldest players in the draft at 24 years old. At the time the Celtics were a playoff contending team. They were championship contenders a few years prior to the 1989 offseason, however the team was declining due to the age growth and injury of star player Larry Bird and the roster had been rapidly changing. The team still made the playoffs in both of the seasons that Smith played for them. In the 1990 playoffs the Celtics faced the New York Knicks. While the Celtics put up a tough fight, they eventually fell in the series-deciding game 5 and lost 3-2.

On February 4, 1990, Smith had a career high 8 assists in a 121-89 win to the Sacramento Kings.

On February 24, 1990, Smith dropped a career high 24 points in a 115-107 win over the Denver Nuggets.

On March 2, 1990, Smith had a career high 10 rebounds in a 122-110 win over the Miami Heat.

In the following season the Celtics returned to the playoffs and played the Indiana Pacers. The Celtics won the series in 5 games and faced the Detroit Pistons in the second round who beat them 4-2. Smith never made the NBA Playoffs in his career ever again.

On October 30, 1991, Smith was waived by the Celtics.

Brescia (1991–1992) 
Smith moved to Italy following his departure from the Celtics. He played the following season with Brescia in Lega Basket.

Milwaukee Bucks (1992) 
Smith returned to the USA and returned to the NBA briefly. On October 8, 1992, Smith signed with the Milwaukee Bucks. Smith stayed with the team for 18 days, however before the season began he was waived on October 26.

CBA (1992–1993) 
Smith played in the CBA for the upcoming season, first for the Capital Region Pontiacs and later, the Oklahoma City Cavalry.

Valencia (1993–1995) 
The next season, 1993–94, Smith played for Valencia Basket.  He continued in Spain, playing the first part of the following season for Estudiantes.

Los Angeles Clippers (1995) 
Smith left Estudiantes and the following month on February 20, 1995, he found his way back to the NBA and signed with the Los Angeles Clippers, a club he remained under contract with until September. The 30 year old played 29 games for the 1994–1995 season. The Clippers had an atrocious 17-65 season and missed the playoffs.

Gijón (1995–1996) 
Smith joined ACB club Gijón Baloncesto for the following season.

Retirement 
Shortly after his tenure ended with the Spanish team, Smith retired from professional basketball. He would later on pursue a career in basketball analysis/commentating.

Smith was the color analyst for the Clippers on Prime Ticket/Fox Sports West with longtime Clipper play-by-play announcer Ralph Lawler until 2017. On September 28, 2018, the Utah Jazz announced that Smith would be a studio broadcast analyst on select games.

References

External links 
 
ACB.com profile

1965 births
Living people
20th-century Mormon missionaries
All-American college men's basketball players
American expatriate basketball people in Italy
American expatriate basketball people in Spain
American men's basketball players
American Mormon missionaries in Argentina
American television sports announcers
Basket Brescia Leonessa players
Basketball players from Los Angeles
Basketball players from New York (state)
Boston Celtics draft picks
Boston Celtics players
BYU Cougars men's basketball players
Capital Region Pontiacs players
CB Estudiantes players
Gijón Baloncesto players
Latter Day Saints from California
Liga ACB players
Los Angeles Clippers players
McDonald's High School All-Americans
Parade High School All-Americans (boys' basketball)
People from Hacienda Heights, California
People from the San Gabriel Valley
Power forwards (basketball)
Small forwards
Sportspeople from Rochester, New York
Valencia Basket players